Combretum padoides, the thicket bushwillow, occurs in the lowlands of tropical and south-eastern Africa. They grow in a range of habitats from muddy riverbanks to dry rocky hillsides. The mostly opposite oval leaves are carried on long slender branches. The trees or shrubs flower in profusion in mid-summer and the 4-winged fruits reach maturity from late summer to mid winter.

Mature plants, though large, don't assume a true tree shape as their drooping branches are adapted to merge or intertwine with surrounding grass and shrubs for support. Combretums with a comparable growth habit are C. celastroides (Jesse), C. edwardsii, C. mossambicense, and C. paniculatum.

References

 E. Pooley, 1997. Trees of Natal 
 K.C. Palgrave, 1984. Trees of Southern Africa 

padoides
Flora of Zimbabwe